The Greater Nashik Metro or Metro NEO is a proposed rapid transit system in the Nashik Metropolitan Region. The system is proposed to reduce traffic congestion as well as provide direct connectivity to Nashik city from its suburbs. The Greater Nashik Metro will connect suburbs of Nashik city like Deolali, Nashik Road, Upnagar, Nashik Airport, Sinnar, Igatpuri, Gangapur Road, Trimbakeshwar, Dindori, Bhagur, Niphad, Adgaon, Ghoti Budruk and Girnare.

This project is implemented and operated by Maharashtra Metro Rail Corporation Limited with the help of Central and State Government, Nashik Metropolitan Region Development Authority (NMRDA) and Nashik Municipal Corporation. It will be India's first Rubber-tyred metro. Maharashtra Chief Minister Uddhav Thackeray in an interview stated that feasibility report will be created soon. Greater Nashik Metro will be implemented by MahaMetro and funded by City and Industrial Development Corporation (CIDCO).

Route

Project details (DPR)
Budget
The Maharashtra government has invested 2,100.6 crore for the "Metro Neo" project.

1st line
The first line is proposed from Shramik nagar (Satpur) in west to Nasik Road railway station in east.
There will be 17 stations on this route. The route will be of 22.5 km.

2nd line
This route is proposed to be built from Gangapur Road to Mumbai Naka.
There will be 10 stations on this route which will be 10.5 km long.

Depots
A tram (rubber tyred metro) depot will be constructed at Shramik nagar.

Interchange station
Interchange station will be constructed at CBS and Gangapur Road

Status updates
 Aug 2019: Maharashtra State Government approved Nashik Metro project.

 Jun 2020: Detailed Project Report (DPR) sent to Central Government for approval.

 Nov 2020: DPR approved from Central Government.
 Jan 2021: Finance Minister Nirmala Sitharaman announces  for Nashik Metro.

See also 

 Mumbai Metro
 Nagpur Metro
 Navi Mumbai Metro
 Pune Metro

References 

Transport in Nashik
Proposed rapid transit in India
Proposed infrastructure in Maharashtra